In numismatics, an overstrike describes a situation in which an existing coin rather than a blank is struck with a new design. This practice is now obsolete and generally occurred for two purposes. Overstriking was sometimes done for technical reasons when a first strike is unsatisfactory, or accidentally if the blank slips out of place or if the dies judder, resulting in a slight doubling of the design. However, sometimes old or worn coins were overstruck with new designs by later rulers or foreign states. 

In the ancient world, use of overstrikes was not uncommon, since the manufacture of flans was resource consumptive; thus a foreign or outdated coin could be overstruck with less investment than new mintage.  Evidence of overstriking appears as early as about 500 BC when coins of Aegina were overstruck by the ancient city of Kydonia on Crete. In this case and many others, the overstrike can be a valuable aid to dating an ancient coin, an era when dates were not commonly affixed to the design. Due to a shortage of silver the mint of George III of Great Britain used Spanish silver dollars in the early 19th century, and overstruck the king's image and legends on them.

See also

 Punch-marked coins
 Planchet
 Chop marks on coins
 Countermark
 Counterfeit

Line notes

Reference sources
 Michael Crawford, Emilio Gabba, Fergus Millar and Anthony M. Snodgrass (1983) Sources for Ancient History, Cambridge University Press, 250 pages  
 C. Michael Hogan, Cydonia, Modern Antiquarian, Jan 23, 2008 
 Otto Mørkholm, Philip Grierson and Ulla Westermark (1991) Early Hellenistic Coinage, Cambridge University Press, 273 pages

External links

Overstrike (numismatics) at The British Museum

Numismatics